Chris Lai Lok-yi (born 15 June 1980) is a Hong Kong actor and host contracted to TVB.

Lai is best known for playing John Ma in the TVB sitcom Come Home Love from 2012 to 2015. In 2018, he was nominated for TVB Anniversary Award for Best Actor for his performance as Elvis Yip in the family drama Who Wants a Baby?.

Background
Lai Lok-yi was born on 15 June 1980 in Hong Kong in a very poor family with 5 members including himself, his parents, an elder brother and a younger brother; he is the middle child. He grew up living in a small flat in Hong Kong. Lai’s father worked very hard to buy a truck for delivery, which helped improve the life of his family. However, at 11 years old, his father died from cancer. After his death, his and his family's lives worsened. His mother worked 2 jobs, an office cleaner and a street vendor, while raising her children. In high school, he started working various part-time jobs in hopes to support his family. He even worked as a docker in 2 big supermarkets in Hong Kong and taught children to earn money.

After graduating from Tung Wah Group of Hospitals Yau Tze Tin Memorial College, Lai worked in a bank. After much pressure, he resigned. Lai signed up for TVB's Artiste Training School in 2001. After 3 unsuccessful interviews, he was eventually chosen due a close resemblance of the late music star Danny Chan.

Career 
Actor career of Lai Lok-yi is a long way from his early rise to success and long plateau.  After making cameo appearances in several dramas, Lai took on his first major supporting role in the sports drama Aqua Heroes while he was still a trainee. He graduated from the school in 2002. In 2003, he starred in the idol drama Hearts of Fencing, leading a cast consisting entirely of rookies. Back then, when he debuted, he was grouped with fellow actors Raymond Lam, Ron Ng, Bosco Wong, Sammul Chan and Kenneth Ma to make up the “Olympic Six”. While the other five in the group have already reached male lead status, Lai was still hovering in second and third line roles. People said that TVB did not intend to make his name although Lai Lok-yi had all the fundamentals to become a successful actor with his tall stature and handsome good looks.

Until 2012, sitcom drama Come Home Love gained a big success, and Lai played the main role as John Ma, which rose him to popularity. In the next few years, Lai also starred in several popular TVB dramas such as: My Unfair Lady, Daddy Cool, Presumed Accidents and The Tofu War . In 2018, Lai starred in the family drama Who Wants a Baby? as the first male lead. The drama earned critical acclaim and garnered him nominations for Best Actor and Most Popular Male Character at the 2018 TVB Anniversary Awards.

The origin of the stage name "Lai Lok Yi" 
His real name is Lai Yat-sing, which was named by his late father. The stage name "Lai Lok Yi" was named by his teacher. He chose his name while filling the form of attending the training artiste class. He believed that this name would bring him the durability in the career.

Personal life 
Lai dated actress Tavia Yeung from 2008 to 2011. From 2011 to 2014, Lai dated Nicole Lee, a former Miss Hong Kong contestant and heiress to a Hong Kong-based beauty corporation. They got married in November 2014. Their son was born in 2017. Their second son was born in early 2022.

Filmography

Television dramas

Music video appearances
2003: "Fong Sang" (放生) by Jade Kwan
2003: "Tung Yau Ji Chui" (痛由自取) by Yumiko Cheng
2005: "San Sai Kai" (新世界) by 2R
2005: "Rolls-Royce" by Denise Ho
2005: "Tei Ping Sin" (地平線) by Ella Koon
2006: "Sam Sang Yau Hang" (三生有幸) by Ronald Cheng
2006: "December Rain" by Rain Li
2008: "Jui Mei Lai Tik Tai Chat Tin" (最美麗的第七天) by Vincy Chan
2008: "Sui Sin Mo Cheung Ngor Jeh Yeung Keung Tik Yan" (誰羨慕像我這樣強的人) by Theresa Fu
2008: "Yee Yan Sai Kai" (二人世界) Linda Chung
2009: "I'm Sorry" by Charlene Choi

References

External links
 Official TVB Blog
 

1980 births
Living people
Hong Kong male television actors
TVB actors
21st-century Hong Kong male actors
Hong Kong male film actors